The 2018–19 Argentine Primera B Nacional was the 34th season of the Argentine second division. The season began on 25 August 2018 and ended on 8 June 2019. Twenty-five teams competed in the league, seventeen returning from the 2017–18 season, four teams that were relegated from Primera División and two teams promoted from Federal A and B Metropolitana.

Competition format
Twenty-five teams played each other once for a total of twenty-four matches each. The champion earns promotion to the Primera División. The teams placed from 2nd to 9th place competed in the "Torneo Reducido" for the second promotion berth after the regular season ended. Two teams were relegated at the end of the season; one with indirect affiliation with AFA was relegated to the Torneo Federal A, while one directly affiliated faced relegation to Primera B Metropolitana.

Club information

Stadia and locations

Personnel

Managerial changes

Foreign players

League table

Championship play-off 

Sarmiento (J) and Arsenal ended up tied in points at the end of the 24 weeks of regular season. Tournament rules establish that, unlike any other position on the table, if two or more teams are equal in points at the end of play, goal difference does not count and a playoff game is required. The winner of this match achieved promotion to the Primera División as champions, while the loser qualified to the Torneo Reducido as runners-up.

Results

Torneo Reducido

Teams ending between second and ninth place played the Torneo Reducido for the second promotion berth to Primera División. Quarterfinals and semi-finals were played over two legs, and in case of a tie the best-placed team advanced. The finals were played over two legs, and a penalty shootout occurred in case of a tie.

Relegation
Clubs with indirect affiliation with AFA are relegated to the Torneo Federal A, while clubs directly affiliated face relegation to Primera B Metropolitana. The bottom team of each table was relegated.

Direct Affiliation

Indirect Affiliation

Season statistics

Top scorers

See also
 2018–19 Argentine Primera División
 2018–19 Torneo Federal A
 2018–19 Primera B Metropolitana
 2018–19 Copa Argentina

References

External links
 soccerway.com
 Ascenso del Interior  
 Interior Futbolero 
 Promiedos  

Primera B Nacional seasons
2018–19 in Argentine football leagues